The Oconee Nuclear Station is a nuclear power station located on Lake Keowee near Seneca, South Carolina, and has a power output capacity of over 2,500 megawatts. It is the second nuclear power station in the United States to have its operating license extended for an additional twenty years by the Nuclear Regulatory Commission (NRC) (the application for the Calvert Cliffs Nuclear Power Plant in Maryland preceded it).

This plant has three Babcock & Wilcox pressurized water reactors, and is operated by Duke Energy.

History
Oconee was the first of three nuclear stations built by Duke Energy. 
According to Duke Energy's web site, the station has generated more than 500 million megawatt-hours of electricity, and is "the first nuclear station in the United States to achieve this milestone."

Constructing the dam on the Keowee River and creating Lake Keowee resulted in the submerging of historic sites: one was Keowee, an important Cherokee town that was destroyed by British forces in the late 18th century. Before this took place, the sites were excavated in archeological work conducted by the University of South Carolina. Thousands of artifacts, and evidence of human and animal remains were found at Keowee. In addition, the site of former Fort Prince George (South Carolina) was also excavated and artifacts recovered.

In the summer of 2011 Oconee became the first nuclear power station in the United States to have its sensors controlled digitally. In 2021, Duke applied for a permit to keep Oconee operating until 2050.

Oconee is unique as it is the only nuclear power plant in the United States that does not rely on emergency diesel generator sets for emergency power. Instead it relies on two hydroelectric units at the nearby Keowee hydroelectric station. In the event the Keowee units are both out of service, emergency power can alternatively be provided by combustion turbines at the nearby Lee fossil generating station. Both sources use alternative cables to supply Oconee's emergency systems; these are independent of the Oconee switchyard and transmission lines, which are the normal source of power.

Electricity Production

Surrounding population

The 2010 U.S. population within  of Oconee was 66,307, an increase of 11.5 percent in a decade, according to an analysis of U.S. Census data for msnbc.com. This includes the main campus of Clemson University. The 2010 U.S. population within  was 1,404,690, an increase of 14.8 percent since 2000. Cities within 50 miles include Greenville (30 miles to city center).

Seismic risk
The NRC's estimate of the risk of an earthquake intense enough to cause core damage to the reactor at Oconee was once every 23,256 years, according to an NRC study published in August 2010.

Flood risk
Duke Energy estimated the probability of a random failure of Jocassee Dam at once every 130,000 years, when floodwaters might cause the loss of power and safety equipment at Oconee. Though the company believed "in worst possible conditions" flooding could lead to a significant release of radioactivity, it concluded "the contribution to core damage frequency from precipitation-induced external flooding is considered negligible." Duke informed the NRC about this flooding hazard as early as January 1996. NRC has estimated the probability of a random failure of Jocassee Dam at once every 28,000 years.

Subsequent to Fukushima, improvements were made to the Oconee site to prevent reactor core damage from flooding from a failure of Jocassee Dam.  The NRC has expressed satisfaction as of June 2016 with the flood protection modifications, which included new or enhanced flood walls and moving some power lines and equipment to less flood-prone locations.

See also

 List of largest power stations in the United States
 Largest nuclear power plants in the United States

References

External links 

Energy infrastructure completed in 1973
Energy infrastructure completed in 1974
Buildings and structures in Oconee County, South Carolina
Nuclear power plants in South Carolina
Nuclear power stations using pressurized water reactors
Duke Energy